Phil Kenyon (born 7 May 1956) is a former English professional squash player.

Born in Blackpool on 7 May 1956 he became the English number one in 1982. Kenyon was part of the British team that won the 1979 Men's World Team Squash Championships in Brisbane, Australia. He also represented England at the 1981, 1983 & 1985 World Team Squash Championships.

References

External links
 

English male squash players
1956 births
Living people